Ludwik "Hanka" Kalkstein, also known as Ludwik Kalkstein-Stoliński (13 March 1920, in Warsaw – 26 October 1994, in Munich), was a Polish Nazi collaborator of German descent. He worked as a Nazi police agent during the German occupation of Poland and then as a Stalinist informant after the Soviet takeover of Poland. Along with his wife (Blanka Kaczorowska "Sroka" (b. 13 October 1922 in Brest, d. 25 August 2004), they became traitors to the Polish AK resistance organization under not one but two consecutive totalitarian regimes. Kalkstein was responsible for the arrest and execution by the Nazis of at least 14 officers of the Polish underground, including General Stefan Rowecki.

Arrested by the Gestapo in April 1942 and interrogated, Kalkstein and Kaczorowska had followed a path taken by other Nazi agents. After collaborating with the Germans and even fighting on their side against the Poles during the Warsaw Uprising of 1944 (Kalkstein joined the SS as "Paul Henchel"), they would later collaborate as informants with the Communist UB after their internment in prison.

Kalkstein was arrested by the UB in August 1953 and then sentenced to life imprisonment on the charge of the betrayal of General Rowecki. The sentence was reduced to 12 years in prison. He was released from prison in 1965 under an amnesty. In 1973 and settled in Piaseczno, Poland where he ran a chicken farm and then moved to the village of Utrata near Jarocin where he owned a large pig farm. In 1981 or 1982, he travelled to France, where his son lived (from a relationship with Blanka Kaczorowski). The family claimed that he died in France in the 1980s. In fact, in the mid-1980s, he emerged in Munich, where he worked in the library of the Polish Catholic Mission under the name of "Edward Ciesielski". He died on 26 October 1994 in Munich, Germany.

See also
 Helena Wolinska-Brus, military prosecutor in Stalinist Poland
 Edward Wasilewski, informant of the Ministry of Public Security until 1960

Notes and references

1920 births
1994 deaths
Gestapo personnel
People from Warsaw
Polish people of World War II
Polish prisoners sentenced to life imprisonment
Polish collaborators with Nazi Germany
Polish people of German descent
Polish emigrants to Germany
Prisoners sentenced to life imprisonment by Poland